Beecher's may refer to:

 Beecher's Bibles, rifles given to anti-slavery immigrants in Kansas, United States in the mid-19th century.
 Beecher's Handmade Cheese, an artisan cheese maker in Seattle, Washington, United States.
 Beecher's Trilobite Bed, fossil bearing location in New York state, United States.
 Beecher's Trilobite type preservation, the preservation of the Beecher's Trilobite Bed.

 Surname
 Billy Beechers, English former professional footballer

See also 
 Becher's Brook, a fence on the Grand National horseracing course, England
 Beecher (disambiguation)